Amsactarctia radiosa is a moth of the family Erebidae. It was described by Arnold Pagenstecher in 1903. It can be found in Ethiopia and Somalia.

References

Moths described in 1903
Spilosomina
Insects of Ethiopia
Fauna of Somalia
Moths of Africa